Aloe babatiensis is an aloe which is found in northern Tanzania.

Description
Aloe babatiensis branches from the base to form thick clumps of stems, each up to 2 meters long, and either erect or sprawling on the ground. 
The leaves are shiny, and a dull green colour without any markings. They are long, slender and recurved downwards.

The tall, erect inflorescence has up to 4 branches. The tubular flowers are bright red to pink, and 35–40 mm long.

References

 World Flora Online entry

babatiensis
Flora of Tanzania